Flavinarosa obscura is a moth in the family Limacodidae. It is found in Taiwan.

The wingspan is 17–22 mm.

References

Moths described in 1911
Limacodidae
Moths of Taiwan